Woljeongsa is a head temple of the Jogye Order of Korean Buddhism, located on the eastern slopes of Odaesan in Pyeongchang County, Gangwon Province, South Korea.  Woljeongsa was founded in 643 by the Silla monk Jajang.

History 
The Origin of Devotion to Manjusri Bodhisattva in Korea

Woljeongsa (Korean: 월정사, Chinese: 月精寺, pronounced “Wol-jeong-sa”) was established by Jajang Yulsa (慈藏律師), a celebrated Vinaya Master of the Silla Dynasty. Jajang went to China to study and had an audience with the manifestation of Manjusri Bodhisattva at Taihe Lake in Shanxi Province. Manjusri then gave Jajang some of the Buddha's cremains, his robe and alms bowl and told him to return to Silla. The bodhisattva said he would meet Jajang again on Mt. Odaesan (五臺山), located northeast of Gyeongju. Upon his return to Korea, Jajang went to (current) Odaesan and built a temporary hut. He prayed in this hut to meet the manifestation of Manjusri again but was not successful because inclement weather lasted for three days.

Later, Sinhyo Geosa, a layman known to be the reincarnation of Learned-Youth Bodhisattva, resided there and cultivated his Buddhist practice. Ven. Sinui, a disciple of National Preceptor Beomil Guksa, built a small hut on the site where Jajang Yulsa had built his and also resided there. After Sinui died, the hut fell into ruin. When Ven. Yuyeon of Sudasa Temple built a hermitage on this site, it finally gained stature as a proper temple.
In 1377, the hermitage burnt to the ground, and Ven. I-il rebuilt it. In 1833 it burnt down again, and in 1844 it was reconstructed by two monks, Yeongdam and Jeongam. During the Korean War, over ten of the temple's buildings, including Chilbul-bojeon, were torched by friendly forces for strategic purposes. It was only in 1964 that reconstruction was begun again by Ven. Tanheo, beginning with the Jeokgwangjeon Hall.

Cultural properties 
The Bodhisattva and His Exquisite Pagoda

Woljeongsa has many items of cultural heritage. There are nine items of state-designated heritage that include: four National Treasures, including the Octagonal Nine Story Stone Pagoda (National Treasure No. 48), and five other designated treasures including a Seated Stone Bodhisattva (Treasure No. 139). In addition, the temple has: 17 pieces of “Tangible Cultural Heritage” designated by Gangwon-do, six pieces of “Cultural Heritage Material,” one “Historic Site,” one item of “Folklore Heritage” and one item of “Registered Cultural Heritage.”
Woljeongsa's Octagonal Nine Story Stone Pagoda is the only pagoda in South Korea that exhibits characteristics of the Goguryeo Kingdom (37 BCE – 668 CE). The beautiful Seated Stone Bodhisattva in front of the pagoda is unusual and only found in northern Gangwon-do, including Gangneung and Woljeongsa. The bronze bell of Sangwonsa, a temple associated with Woljeongsa, is the oldest temple bell produced in Korea. The bell comes with an interesting legend and boasts exquisite beauty in both its shape and the inscribed flying celestial figures on its body.

In the Main Hall there is a statue of Gautama Buddha, but the more important statue is of an unusual Bodhisattva, 1.8 meters high, probably Medicine Buddha. Said to have been found in the Diamond Pond to the south of the temple, the statue is offering to an unknown figure. The statue is wearing a crown, the face is long, and the ears are slightly hidden by the long hair.

Around the neck there are three lines which are carved to look like necklaces. The elbow is resting on the head of a young boy. Because of its unusual style, the statue is thought to have been carved in the 11th century by craftsmen belonging to a special sect.

Nine Storey Stone Pagoda

Woljeonsa'a Octagonal Nine Storey Stone Pagoda, called the Sari-pagoda (relic pagoda) believed to have been constructed in the 10th century, is a multi-angled stone pagoda standing 15.2 meters/50 foot high and is representative of the multi-storied pagodas popular during the Goryo Period, especially in the northern regions of Korea.

The presently exposed stone base is not the original, with the original now being below the surface.  A flat stone base has been laid over the original base and is carved with lotus flowers and other images.

Pillars are delicately carved into each corner of the upper face of the stone.  The shape of the first tier and the door-frame images on all sides of the stone body along with the horizontal roof stone is representative of the Goryeo Period.

The roof and body stone structure of the nine storeys gives this pagoda a feeling of stability.  The thin body, curved corners, door-frame on the lower body and the variations in the octagonal shape illustrate the unique and aristocratic characteristics of the Goryeo era Buddhist culture.

Woljeonsa'a Octagonal Nine Storey Stone Pagoda is National Treasure number 48.

List of treasure 

 National Treasure No. 36 Dong Jong (Bronze Bell)
 National Treasure No. 48 Octagonal Nine-story stone Pagoda of Woljeongsa Temple
 National Treasure No. 221 Wooden Seated Child Manjusri of Sangwonsa Temple
 National Treasure No. 292 Documents of Sangwonsa Temple
 Treasure No. 139 Stone Seated Bodhisattva
 Treasure No. 793 Excavated Relics from the Wooden Seated Child Manjusriof Sangwonsa Temple
 Treasure No. 1375 Reliquaries from the Octagonal Nine-story Stone Pagodaof Woljeongsa Temple
 Treasure No. 1811 Wooden Seated Manjusri Bodhisattva and Excavated Relics of Sangwonsa Temple 
 Treasure No. 1812 Excavated Documents from Wooden Seated Manjusri Statue of Sangwonsa Temple
 Gangwon Tangible Cultural Property No. 28 Hall of Sublime Equanimity in Woljeongsa Temple
 Gangwon Tangible Cultural Property No. 53 Statue of 6-hands Avalokitesvara in Woljeongsa Temple
 Gangwon Tangible Cultural Property No. 54 Tripitaka Koreana
 Gangwon Tangible Cultural Property No. 130 Wooden Seated Statue of Buddha and Excavated Relics in Youngheungsa Temple
 Gangwon Tangible Cultural Property No. 131 Wooden Seated Statue of Buddha and Excavated Relics in Gounam, North hermitage in Woljeongsa Temple
 Gangwon Tangible Cultural Property No. 132 Wooden Seated Statue of Amitabha Buddha and Excavated Relics in Unheungsa Temple
 Gangwon Tangible Cultural Property No. 133 Dharma Bell in Yongdasa Temple
 Gangwon Tangible Cultural Property No. 134 Hanging Scroll of Vairocana Buddha behind the Buddha in Youngwonsa Temple
 Gangwon Tangible Cultural Property No. 135 Buddhist Painting of Buddha giving a sermon in Youngwonsa Temple
 Gangwon Tangible Cultural Property No. 136 Tripitaka Painting and excavated relics in Guryongsa Temple
 Gangwon Tangible Cultural Property No. 137 Buddhist Painting of Avalokitesvra in Unsuam Hermitage
 Gangwon Tangible Cultural Property No. 138 Buddhist Painting of 1,000 Dragons in Unheungsa Temple
 Gangwon Tangible Cultural Property No. 139 Hanging Scroll behind the Buddha and Excavated Relics in the Hall of Sa-seung (four saints), Bodeoksa Temple
 Gangwon Tangible Cultural Property No. 140 Painting of National Preceptor Beomil Jinyoung in Youngeunsa Temple
 Gangwon Cultural Property No. 141 Painting of Great Seon Master Samyeongdang Jinyoung
 Gangwon Cultural Property No. 169 Wooden Seated Ksitigarbha and Excavated Relics in Jijangam Hermitage in Samcheok City
 Gangwon Cultural Property No. 170 Shakyamuni triad and excavated relics in Youngeunsa Temple, Samcheok City
 Gangwon Cultural Property No. 42 Buddha-stupas in Woljeongsa Temple
 Gangwon Cultural Property No. 134 Odaesan Jungdae Bulryangmun (Book that recorded the list of donors both monastics and laypeople for building the Hall of Sublime Equanimity in the late-Joseon period)
 Gangwon Cultural Property No. 135 Odaesan Jungdae Bulryang Gyewonsubomun (Record of the list of items in the Hall of Sublime Equanimity made when transferring the hermitage in charge of management to another one)
 Gangwon Cultural Property No. 157 Stone Seated Statue of Buddha in Bodeoksa Temple
 Gangwon Cultural Property No. 158 Milbu in Woljengsa Temple
 Gangwon Cultural Property No. 159 Documents in Odaesan Mountain Historic Archive
 Historic Site No. 37 Odaesan Mountain Historic Archive
 Important Folklore Cultural Property No. 219 Ornamented Jacket of King Sejo
 Registered Cultural Property No. 645 Kasaya of Buddhist Monk Hanam

Templestay program 

Woljeongsa offers Templestay programs for visitors where visitors can experience Buddhist culture.

Gallery

See also
 Korean architecture
 Korean Buddhist temples

References

External links

 Woljeongsa Official website
 KoreaTemple profile
 Buddhapia profile

Pyeongchang County
Buddhist temples in South Korea
Buddhist temples of the Jogye Order
Silla
Goryeo
643 establishments
Religious organizations established in the 7th century
Stone pagodas
Pagodas in South Korea
Religious buildings and structures completed in 643
7th-century Buddhist temples